Protein Science is a peer-reviewed scientific journal covering research on the structure, function, and biochemical significance of proteins, their role in molecular and cell biology, genetics, and evolution, and their regulation and mechanisms of action. It is published by Wiley-Blackwell on behalf of The Protein Society. The 2021 impact factor of the journal is 6.725.

Abstracting and indexing 
Since January 2008, published articles are deposited in PubMed Central with a 12-month embargo. Protein Science is indexed and abstracted in MEDLINE, Science Citation Index, and Scopus.

References

External links
 
 The Protein Society

Publications established in 1992
Biochemistry journals
Wiley-Blackwell academic journals
Monthly journals
English-language journals